Semrajpur is a village nearly 25 km from Mau in eastern direction. Semrajpur has a pin code of 221706  and comes under post office of Semrajpur. It belongs to Ratanpura block and constituency of Ghosi. Semrajpur Gram Panchayat has 4 primary schools that promote education among children until their primary education. The schools in Semrajpur are a part of Mid Day Meal Authority Plan launched by Government of India to facilitate free lunch for students enrolled in primary schools.

References 

Villages in Mau district